Alexandra Thomson Studholme (24 May 1867 – 15 October 1907) was a British composer who published her music under the name Alexandra Thomson (also seen as Thompson). She is best remembered today for her work for chorus and orchestra, Battle of the Baltic.

Thomson's parents were Zoe Skene and the Reverend William Thomson, the Archbishop of York. On 23 June 1897 Thomson married John Studholme (1864-1934) and they had four sons: John, Richard, Derek, and Humphrey.

Thomson studied music with Dr. John Naylor. In October 1890, Her composition Battle of the Baltic was performed at the Hovingham Festival in Yorkshire. She wrote articles about music and composed songs and madrigals, including:

Article 

Music at Home

Orchestra 

Battle of the Baltic (chorus and orchestra; text by Thomas Campbell)

Vocal 

Fairy Queene (SATB madrigal)
Shepherd's Elegy: Holiday in Arcady

References 

British women composers
British composers
1867 births
1907 deaths
Madrigal composers